Nebria danmanni is a species of ground beetle from Nebriinae subfamily that is endemic to the US state of  Washington.

References

danmanni
Beetles described in 1981
Beetles of North America
Endemic fauna of Washington (state)